Seven Reloaded is the fourth internationally released album in 2005 of the Turkish pop singer Mustafa Sandal.

Track listing
"İsyankar (Sabor de Amor – Punjabi MC Version)" – 4:01
"Kavrulduk" –  3:5
"Fıkra" – 4:30
"Aya Benzer 2003 (Moonlight)" – 3:57
"All My Life" – 3:44
"Gel Aşkım" – 3:53
"Story" – 3:43
"Araba (Single Version)" – 3:51
"İsyankar (Beathovenz Cut)" – 3:51
"İsyankar (Summer Breeze Mix)" – 3:59

Credits
 Music direction, arrangements: Mustafa Sandal, Bülent Aris, Panjabi MC, Beathoavenz
 Mixing: Bülent Aris, Ayhan Sayıner
 Publishing: EMI Music Publishing UK 
 Photography: Zeynel Abidin

Music videos
 "İsyankar (Beathovenz Cut)"
 "Kavrulduk"

Notes 

Mustafa Sandal albums